The Ottawa Memorial is a monument in Ottawa, Ontario, that "commemorates by name almost 800 men and women who lost their lives while serving or training with the Air Forces of the Commonwealth in Canada, the West Indies and the United States and who have no known grave.  " Located on Sussex Drive overlooking the Ottawa River near the Rideau Falls, the monument was unveiled in 1959 by Elizabeth II, Queen of Canada. It is maintained by the Commonwealth War Graves Commission.
During the Second World War, 798 men and women killed with Commonwealth air forces in or over Canadian territory.

The memorial lists the names, ranks and nations of origin of almost 800 service personnel, ordered by the year of their death, on two semi-circular walls that surround a small pool containing a sculpture of the world with an eagle perched on top. Plaques in English and French contain the following text:

See also

 British Commonwealth Air Training Plan
 Royal Canadian Air Force
 Royal Air Force
 Royal Australian Air Force
 Monarchy in Ontario

References

External links

 National Capital Commission
 Veteran Affairs Canada

Canadian military memorials and cemeteries
1959 sculptures
World War II memorials in Canada
Monuments and memorials in Ottawa